The Algeria Billie Jean King Cup team represents Algeria in the Billie Jean King Cup tennis competition and are governed by the Fédération Algerienne de Tennis.  They currently compete in the Europe/Africa Zone of Group III.

History
Algeria competed in its first Fed Cup in 1997.  Their best result was finishing third in their Group II pool in 2001 and 2002.

Players

See also
Fed Cup
Algeria Davis Cup team

External links

Billie Jean King Cup teams
Fed Cup
Fed Cup